Alejandra Campoverdi (born September 20, 1979) is an American women’s health advocate and former White House aide. Under President Barack Obama, Campoverdi was the first White House Deputy Director of Hispanic Media.

Early life and education
Born in Los Angeles, Campoverdi was raised by a single mother and her grandmother who immigrated to the United States from Mexico. Campoverdi's mother initially worked in a factory that manufactured car floor mats before later becoming a kindergarten teacher at a school in inner-city Los Angeles. Campoverdi spent her childhood sharing a cramped apartment with her mother, grandmother, and several aunts and uncles. There were periods when her family was on welfare, WIC and Medi-Cal, California’s public health insurance program. Campoverdi attended Saint Monica Catholic High School on financial assistance and with the support of non-profits and pipeline programs.

She graduated cum laude from the Annenberg School for Communication and Journalism at the University of Southern California. Campoverdi worked as a part-time actress and model during her time at USC to pay for her education. She later received her Master of Public Policy from the Kennedy School of Government at Harvard University. Campoverdi pointed to the vote for 1994 California Proposition 187 and the 1992 Los Angeles riots as events that shaped her worldview and served as a political awakening.

Career
After working for the Agricultural Worker Health Initiative at The California Endowment, a health-focused foundation that expands access to quality and affordable healthcare to underserved communities in California, and following her master's degree, Campoverdi was hired by then-Senator Barack Obama's 2008 presidential campaign, to work in the Chicago headquarters. She lived off her credit cards, had no health insurance and stayed in supporter housing. Campoverdi's focus during the campaign was outreach to various constituent groups, including the Latino community.

Following Obama's victory, Campoverdi was appointed to work in the West Wing of the White House as Special Assistant to the White House Deputy Chief of Staff for Policy, Mona Sutphen. She later became the first ever White House Deputy Director of Hispanic Media. In the latter role, Campoverdi developed and implemented the White House’s communications strategy directed towards the Hispanic community and briefed President Obama in preparation for interviews with Hispanic media. Campoverdi also worked on White House communications around a broad range of issues, including the Affordable Care Act and its effects on the Latino community.

In 2012, Campoverdi left the White House and joined Univision as Senior Advisor for Innovation and Communications Strategy. Campoverdi subsequently served as Managing Editor of #EmergingUS at the Los Angeles Times, a multimedia venture founded by Jose Antonio Vargas that explores race, immigration and the emerging American identity.

In December 2016, Campoverdi announced that she would seek the nomination of the Democratic Party in the 34th congressional district special election, to replace Xavier Becerra, who has been appointed to succeed Kamala Harris as Attorney General of California.

Campoverdi cited the election of Donald Trump and the potential repeal of the Affordable Care Act as her motivation to run. In the April 4, 2017 primary election, Campoverdi did not make the run-off, and former California Assembly member Jimmy Gomez was elected.

Boards 
Campoverdi serves on the Boards of Harvard’s Shorenstein Center on Media, Politics and Public Policy, the California Community Foundation, the Harvard Journal of Hispanic Policy, UCLA's Center for Diverse Leadership in Science, and is a member of the Pacific Council on International Policy.

In 2017, Campoverdi was appointed to serve as a Commissioner for the California Children and Families Commission, also known as First 5 California. The Commission is a statewide body that is dedicated to improving the lives of California’s youngest citizens and their families through a multi-faceted approach that includes education, health services, childcare, and other vital programs.

She is a volunteer teacher for InsideOUT Writers, through which she teaches a weekly creative writing class to incarcerated youth in Los Angeles’ Central Juvenile Hall.

Women's health advocacy

In March 2017, Campoverdi revealed in a profile by The Washington Post that she has inherited the BRCA2 gene mutation, giving her an 85% risk of developing breast cancer, and that she planned to have a preventive double mastectomy. Campoverdi lost both her great-grandmother and grandmother to breast cancer, and her mother and two aunts have also battled the disease.

Campoverdi made the protection of access to affordable healthcare and the Affordable Care Act a focus of her congressional campaign, choosing to speak publicly about her personal health in an effort to bring attention to the stakes of limited access to healthcare. Two days after she went public with her diagnosis, she released a television ad saying, "If Donald Trump wants to have a conversation about women's bodies, let's start with mine."

In 2017, Campoverdi was awarded Penn Medicine's Basser Center for BRCA's inaugural YLC Distinguished Advocacy Award for her advocacy around BRCA-related cancers.

In October 2018, Campoverdi underwent a preventive double mastectomy to lower her risk of developing breast cancer. Routine testing of the removed tissue subsequently revealed she had unknowingly had Stage 0, non-invasive breast cancer, which every previous mammogram, ultrasound, and MRI had not detected. Because of her recent preventive surgery, Campoverdi did not need to do any additional treatment. Campoverdi said, "I beat breast cancer before I even knew I had it."

Campoverdi speaks often about the importance of being your own best health advocate and her decision to be "CEO of her own body." She is the founder of The Well Woman Coalition, an initiative aiming to empower women of color to have agency over their own health and healing through awareness, education, and advocacy. Campoverdi also founded LATINX & BRCA in partnership with Penn Medicine's Basser Center for BRCA. LATINX & BRCA is the first awareness campaign on the BRCA gene mutation that targets Latinos and offers Spanish-language educational materials.

In an op-ed for Cosmopolitan, Campoverdi wrote, "Now more than ever, we must recognize and accept the complexity of real women, and celebrate them in their quest for leadership roles. Whole, multidimensional women. Please throw your name in the arena, whichever one you’re in — because it only gets better every time one of us tries."

Documentary film, "Inheritance: Women, BRCA, and Hereditary Cancer," - 2019

Alejandra Campoverdi appeared in the film Inheritance she and documentarian Jonathan Silvers co-produced about an inherited variant for the BRCA gene. The gene equates to a higher than average risk for breast and / or ovarian cancer. 

A medical device company, Sientra Breast Implant Company, is the corporate sponsor of the film that had an estimated $800,000 budget.

The narrative follows multiple women as they experience mastectomy. Alongside warnings about the BRCA gene and a controversial look at pre-implantation genetic diagnosis, several of the stories include elective plastic surgery. Science shows that liposuction causes an increase in disease producing visceral fat and may cause many health and aesthetic problems. Nowhere in the film are the dangers and problems of liposuction mentioned.

References

Further reading
 
 

Living people
Women in California politics
Harvard Kennedy School alumni
1979 births
USC Annenberg School for Communication and Journalism alumni
Obama administration personnel
Hispanic and Latino American politicians
Hispanic and Latino American women in politics
Politicians from Los Angeles
Mexican-American people in California politics
21st-century American women politicians
21st-century American politicians